Euphorbia neoarborescens is a species of plant in the family Euphorbiaceae. It is endemic to Tanzania. It is listed as vulnerable by the IUCN.

References 

Endemic flora of Tanzania
neoarborescens
Vulnerable plants
Taxonomy articles created by Polbot